The Wide Range Assessment of Memory and Learning (WRAML), currently in its third edition (WRAML3), is a standardized test that measures an individual's memory functioning. It evaluates both immediate and delayed memory ability along with the acquisition of new learning. The WRAML3 is normed for individuals ages 5–90 years. 

The WRAML3 is composed of two verbal, two visual, and two attention-concentration subtests, yielding a Verbal Memory Index, a Visual Memory Index, and an Attention-Concentration Index. Together, these subtests yield the General Memory Index. The Working Memory Index consists of the Symbolic Working Memory and Verbal Working Memory subtests. In addition, there are four recognition subtests.

The WRAML3 was originally published by Psychological Assessment Resources, Inc. and is currently published by Pearson Assessments.

References

Further reading
Wide Range Achievement Test

External links 
 WRAML3 Publisher

Memory tests